Lupin the 3rd Part III: The Pink Jacket Adventures, also known simply as  is a Japanese anime television series produced by TMS Entertainment. Part of the Lupin III franchise, it is the third anime television adaptation of the Lupin III manga series created by Monkey Punch. The series aired on Yomiuri Telecasting Corporation between March 3, 1984 and November 6, 1985.

Among English-speaking fans, the series is commonly known as the "Pink Jacket" series in reference to the title character's outfit, which replaces Part Is green jacket and Part IIs red jacket with a bright pink one. The feature film Legend of the Gold of Babylon (1985) was released in theaters during the original broadcast run of this television series, and remains the only film in the Lupin III franchise to feature the pink jacket.

Premise
The series centers on the adventures of Lupin III, the grandson of Arsène Lupin, the gentleman thief of Maurice Leblanc's series of novels. He is joined by Daisuke Jigen, crack-shot and Lupin's closest ally; Fujiko Mine, the femme fatale and Lupin's love interest who works against Lupin more often than with him; and Goemon Ishikawa XIII, a master swordsman and the descendant of Ishikawa Goemon, the legendary Japanese bandit. Lupin is often chased by Inspector Koichi Zenigata, the rather cynical detective who has made it his life mission to catch Lupin.

Cast

Production
Yūzō Aoki, who had experience with the previous Lupin anime series as a key animator and storyboard artist, designed the characters and served as animation supervisor. Aoki proposed three character designs for Lupin in this series. A hard Lupin, a soft Lupin and a comical Lupin. His aim was to be in between the gritty style of Masaaki Osumi and the family friendly tone of Isao Takahata and Hayao Miyazaki from Lupin the Third Part I.

Towards the later half of the series, the production team revised the initial character designs to allow for a more cartoonish and expressive appearance, with the aim, in Aoki's words, of achieving a "simple yet satisfying result." Due to the diverse animation teams involved, as well as the decision to have three character designs for Lupin, the designs and overall look of the show tended to differ greatly from episode to episode and even within the same episode, an intentional decision from Aoki which let the animators express a wide range of creativity.

Music for the series including the opening and ending themes was written by Yuji Ohno. The opening theme "Sexy Adventure" was performed by Yūsuke Nakamura and the ending theme "Fairy Night" was performed by Sonia Rosa.

Release
A DVD box set of the series was released in Japan on May 26, 2002 by VAP, followed by a Blu-ray box set on February 22, 2017. In December 2020, Discotek Media announced that they had licensed the series for North American release. They released all 50 episodes in a Blu-ray box set on August 31, 2021.

Episodes

References

External links 

  
 
 
 Lupin III Part III on LupinEncyclopedia.com

1984 anime television series debuts
Discotek Media
Lupin the Third
Lists of Lupin the Third episodes
Nippon TV original programming
TMS Entertainment

es:Anexo:Episodios de Lupin III#Serie 3 (1984)